This is a list of the team rosters for each team for the 2018–19 Australian Baseball League season.

Adelaide Bite

Auckland Tuatara

Brisbane Bandits

Canberra Cavalry

Geelong-Korea

Melbourne Aces

Perth Heat

Sydney Blue Sox

References

Australian Baseball League team rosters